Mis Boleros Favoritos is a compilation album by Mexican singer Luis Miguel. Released on 8 October 2002 by Warner Music Latina, it contains thirteen previously-recorded songs from the Romance-themed albums as well as a new track "Hasta Que Vuelvas". A special edition of the record was released on the same day and includes a DVD containing seven music videos from the bolero-themed discs. "Hasta Que Vuelvas" was released as a single for the album and peaked at number 16 on Billboards Hot Latin Songs chart in the United States. Iván Adaime of AllMusic gave the album a 3.5 out of 5 star rating citing that the new song and music videos are the only incentives for fans to buy it and noted the album's purpose to end the Romance era. "Hasta Que Vuelvas" received a Latin Grammy nomination for Record of the Year in 2003. Commercially, Mis Boleros Favoritos peaked at number three on Billboards Top Latin Albums chart in the United States, number one in Spain, and number seven in Argentina.

Background and content
In 2001, Luis Miguel released Mis Romances, the fourth album in the Romance series in which Miguel covers Latin American boleros. The record was met with unfavorable reviews by music critics and was a commercial flop. On 20 September 2002, Miguel announced that he would release a compilation album featuring previously-recorded boleros from the Romance series. The record also features a new track, "Hasta Que Vuelvas", originally composed by Mario Arturo Ramos; it was arranged by Bebu Silvetti and Juan Carlos Calderón. Miguel dedicated the song to his mother Marcela Basteri who disappeared in 1986 and mentioned that it was originally considered for inclusion on Mis Romances. "Hasta Que Vuelvas" was released as a single on 3 October and peaked at number 16 on the Billboard Hot Latin Songs chart in the United States. Mis Boleros Favoritos was released on 8 October 2002 and a special edition of the disc includes a DVD which contains seven music videos from the Romance series.

Reception
AllMusic critic Iván Adaime rated Mis Boleros Favoritos 3.5 out of 5 stars highlighting songs such as "No Sé Tú", and "Somos Novios" as several of the "greatest hits in Spanish, in any genre". He also noted that the album serves to "close this era" of the bolero records and stated that the inclusion of "Hasta Que Vuelvas" and the music videos are the only incentives for "any die-hard fan". "Hasta Que Vuelvas" was nominated in the category of Record of the Year at the 4th Annual Latin Grammy Awards in 2003. In the United States, Mis Boleros Favoritos debuted and peaked at number three on the Billboard Top Latin Albums and was certified double Platinum in the Latin field by the Recording Industry Association of America for shipping 200,000 copies. In Spain, the disc debuted on the top of the Spanish Albums Chart and received a Platinum certification in the country for shipments of 100,000 copies. In Argentina, it peaked at number seven on the Argentine Albums Chart and the DVD was certified Platinum for shipping 8,000 copies.

Track listing

Charts

Weekly charts

Monthly charts

Year-end charts

Certifications

Personnel
Adapted from the Mis Boleros Favoritos liner notes:

Hasta Que Vuelvas
Alfredo Mathus – guitar recording engineer
Luis Miguel – producer, vocals
Rafa Sardina – voice recording engineer
Al Schmidt – audio mixing
Al Schmitt – string recording engineer
Bebu Silvetti – arranger, music director

See also
2002 in Latin music
List of number-one albums of 2002 (Spain)

References 

2002 compilation albums
2002 video albums
Luis Miguel compilation albums
Luis Miguel video albums
Music video compilation albums
Spanish-language compilation albums
Spanish-language video albums
Warner Music Latina compilation albums
Warner Music Latina video albums